Afzelia pachyloba, the white afzelia or apa, is an economic species of tropical forest tree in the family Fabaceae. It is found in tropical Western and Central Africa where it is threatened by habitat loss.

References

pachyloba
Flora of West Tropical Africa
Trees of Africa
Vulnerable plants
Taxonomy articles created by Polbot